Roderick David Finlayson (26 April 1904 – 2 August 1992) was a New Zealand architectural draughtsman, writer, farm labourer and printing-room assistant. He was born in Devonport, Auckland, New Zealand on 26 April 1904.

References

1904 births
1992 deaths
New Zealand writers
20th-century New Zealand architects
Writers from Auckland